Shigefumi (written: 重文 or 成文) is a masculine Japanese given name. Notable people with the name include:

, Japanese video game designer
, Japanese politician
, Japanese mathematician

See also
6979 Shigefumi, a main-belt asteroid

Japanese masculine given names